Richie Kaczor (9 December 1952 – April 1993) was an early DJ during disco's infancy in the 1970s.

His DJ career began in New Jersey, Kaczor played at clubs in New York City and surrounding states before being asked by nightclub owners Steve Rubell and Ian Schrager to begin a residency at Studio 54. Kaczor, along with Nicky Siano, were the two original DJs to play at the New York venue.

At Studio 54, Kaczor most notably championed Gloria Gaynor's track "I Will Survive", a song which became widely accepted as a disco anthem. Siano asserts that it was Kaczor who first noticed the track, originally a B-side to "Substitute", and turned it into a success. It became so well associated with Studio 54 that fellow DJs from Kaczor's time were amazed when the song was not included in the sound track to 54, a movie based on Studio 54. Tom Moulton, DJ and remixer associated with the development of the 12" dance single recalled: "Well, it can't be about Studio 54 then, because Richie played that record. It became his biggest record."

On March 4, 1980, Kaczor and Studio 54 lighting engineer Robert DeSilva opened the upper level Disco 40 in Hamilton Bermuda.

Kaczor died in 1993 at age 40.

External links 
http://www.discomuseum.net/DJRichieKaczor.html
http://www.nickysiano.com

References 

Club DJs
American DJs
1993 deaths
1952 births
20th-century American musicians
Electronic dance music DJs